Robert Elgin McKinley (14 August 1928 – 16 October 2022) was a Canadian politician who was a Progressive Conservative party member of the House of Commons of Canada. His career included investment and insurance brokering, business and farming.

McKinley represented the Huron electoral district (which became Huron—Middlesex and Huron—Bruce during his terms in Parliament) since first winning office in the 1965 federal election. He was re-elected in 1968, 1972, 1974 and 1979. He left national politics in 1980 as he did not campaign in that year's federal election after serving successive terms from the 27th to the 31st Canadian Parliaments. McKinley died on 16 October 2022, at the age of 94.

References

External links
 

1928 births
2022 deaths
Members of the House of Commons of Canada from Ontario
Progressive Conservative Party of Canada MPs